Chao is a surname in various cultures. It is the Pinyin spelling of two Chinese surnames ( and ), the Wade–Giles spelling of two others ( or the much rarer , both spelled in Pinyin as Zhào), and a regional or other spelling of two additional Chinese surnames ( Cáo and  Zhōu). It is also a Galician and Portuguese surname.

Origins

Chinese surname Cháo

This surname is written with a character meaning "dawn". According to traditional sources including Fengsu Tongyi, Yuanhe Xingzuan, Xingshi Kaolüe, and the surnames/clans section of the Tongzhi encyclopedia, both this surname and another written with a character also meaning "dawn" originated from personal names of people during the Spring and Autumn period, and were adopted by their descendants as surnames, following which some descendants changed their surname from one character to the other. The biography of Chao Cuo in the Records of the Grand Historian stated that the surname originated in the Nanyang Commandery, specifically in the ancient region of Xi'e.

In Sino-Korean pronunciation, those characters are both read Jo, but are not used as surnames in modern Korea (the Korean surname Jo is written with different characters). In Sino-Vietnamese pronunciation, it is read Triều; the spelling is distinct from Triệu, the Sino-Vietnamese reading of the surname Zhào (趙/赵).

It is listed on the Hundred Family Surnames poem.

Chinese surname Cháo

Another Chinese surname, homophonous with the above in Mandarin, is written with a character meaning "nest". Traditional sources note two different origins for this surname. The  states that it refers to the legendary Youchao, who purportedly lived in a nest high up in a tree before he invented houses; his name literally means "having a nest". The  states that it originated as a toponymic surname referring to the state of Chao; following the defeat of the state of Chao by the state of Wu during the latter part of the Spring and Autumn period, some of the people of the defeated state adopted Chao as their surname.

In Sino-Korean pronunciation, this character is read So, but it is not used as a surname in modern Korea (the Korean surname So is written with different characters). In Sino-Vietnamese pronunciation, it is read Sào.

Other
Chao is also an alternative spelling of four other Chinese surnames, listed below by their spelling in Pinyin; see those articles for the traditional origins of those surnames:
Zhào, a common Chinese surname, spelled Chao in the Wade–Giles romanisation system
Zhào, a much rarer surname also spelled Chao in Wade–Giles
Zhōu, spelled Chao based on its pronunciation in Cantonese. This spelling is common in Macau.
Cáo, sometimes spelled in non-standard fashion as Chao

Chao may also be a Portuguese and Galician surname, derived from Galician-Portuguese , meaning "plain" or "plateau".

Statistics
In the Third National Population Census of the People's Republic of China in 1982, Cháo meaning "dawn" was found to be the 361st-most-common surname, while Cháo meaning "nest" was 420th-most-common. Zhào was the seventh-most-common surname, but it is not spelled Chao in mainland China. In Taiwan, where that latter surname frequently is spelled Chao, it was the 43rd-most-common surname in 2005, according to a survey of household registration data by the Ministry of the Interior that year.

In Spain, statistics of the  stated that there were 2,703 people with the surname Chao in Galicia, making it the 244th-most-common surname there. The surname could be found in 68 of the 313 municipalities of Galicia. Municipalities with particularly high concentrations of bearers of the surname included Muras (61 people; 2.99% of the local population), Ourol (69; 2.45%), and  Pedrafita do Cebreiro (52; 1.72%), all in the Province of Lugo (as were all but one of the ten municipalities with the highest concentrations of bearers of the surname).

According to statistics cited by Patrick Hanks, there were 143 people on the island of Great Britain and none on the island of Ireland with the surname Chao as of 2011. The surname was not present on the island of Great Britain in 1881.

The 2010 United States Census found 10,398 people with the surname Chao, making it the 3,432nd-most-common name in the country. This represented an increase from 8,633 (3,769th-most-common) in the 2000 Census. In both censuses, slightly less than nine-tenths of the bearers of the surname identified as Asian, between five and seven per cent as Hispanic, and between three and five percent as White. It was the 135th-most-common surname among respondents to the 2000 Census who identified as Asian.

People

Chinese surname Cháo
Chao Cuo, Han Dynasty official
Chao Heng, Chinese name of Abe no Nakamaro (698–770), Japanese-born Tang Dynasty governor of Annam
Chao Chongzhi, Chinese poet
Chao Na (born 1980), Chinese swimmer

Fictional characters:
Chao Gai in the 14th-century Chinese novel Water Margin

Chinese surname Cháo
Chao Yuanfang, Sui Dynasty court physician and medical author
Chao Pengfei (born 1987), Chinese football striker

Chinese surname Zhào

T. C. Chao (1888–1979), Chinese Christian theologian
Yuen Ren Chao (1892–1982), Chinese-born American linguist
Chung-Yao Chao (1902–1998), Chinese physicist
Chao Shao-an (1905–1998), Chinese artist
Chao Yao-tung (1916–2008), Taiwanese politician
Edward C. T. Chao (1919–2008), Chinese-born American geologist
Ting Tsung Chao (1921–2008), Chinese-born plastics entrepreneur
Kwang-Chu Chao (1925–2013), Chinese-born American chemist
James S. C. Chao (born 1927), Chinese-born American philanthropist and shipping businessman
Ruth Mulan Chu Chao (1930–2007), Chinese-born American philanthropist
Chao Tzee Cheng (1934–2000), Chinese-born Singaporean forensic pathologist
Cecil Chao (born 1936), Hong Kong financial industry businessman
Chao Shou-po (born 1941), Taiwanese politician
Chao Hick Tin (born 1942), Singaporean judge
Wing T. Chao (born 1944), Chinese-born American architect
James Y. Chao (born 1947), Taiwan-born American plastics entrepreneur, son of Ting Tsung Chao
Albert Chao (born 1949), Taiwan-born American plastics entrepreneur, son of Ting Tsung Chao
Anne Chao (born 1951), Taiwanese environmental statistician
Elaine Chao (born 1953), American politician (U.S. Secretary of Transportation), daughter of Ruth Mulan Chu Chao
Winston Chao (born 1960), Taiwanese actor
Chao Chuan (born 1960), Taiwanese pop singer
Sissey Chao (born 1963), Taiwanese musician
Chao Cheng-yu (born 1966), Taiwanese politician
Chao Fong-pang (born 1967), Taiwanese pool player
Rosalind Chao (born 1967), American actress
Cindy Chao (born 1970s), Taiwanese jewellery designer
Chao Chien-ming (born 1972), Taiwanese surgeon, son-in-law of former president Chen Shui-bian
Chao Chih-Kuo (born 1972), Taiwanese long jumper
Joyce Chao (born 1979), Taiwanese actress
Chao Chih-chien (born 1983), Taiwanese track and field athlete
Mark Chao (born 1984), Taiwanese actor
Ruth Chao (designer) (born 1988), Hong Kong designer
Allen Chao, Chinese-born American pharmaceuticals businessman
Chao Hsiu-wa, Taiwanese politician

Chinese surname Cáo
Chao Kuang Piu (born 1920),  Hong Kong textiles businessman
Charles Chao (born 1961), Chinese businessman, CEO and president of Sina Corp.

Chinese surname Zhōu
Jason Chao (born 1986), Macau activist
Chao Man Hou (born 1996), Macau swimmer

Other
People with other surnames spelled Chao, or for whom the Chinese characters of their names are unavailable: 
Ramon Chao (1935–2018), Spanish journalist
Alexander Wu Chao (born 1949), Taiwanese-American physicist
Manu Chao (born 1961), French musician
Chan Chao (born 1966), Burmese-born American photographer
Mariano Chao (born 1972), Argentine field hockey goalkeeper
Avianna Chao (born 1975), Chinese-born Canadian sport shooter
Zoë Chao (born 1985), American actress
Peter Chao, alias of Davin Tong (born 1987), Canadian YouTube personality
Lin Chao, American evolutionary biologist
Roger Chao, Australian explorer
Ruth K. Chao, American psychologist
Tom X. Chao, American playwright
Vic Chao, American actor

Fictional characters:
Lily Chao, first appeared in the BBC medical drama Casualty in 2013

See also

Chal (name)
Char (name)

References

Chinese-language surnames
Galician-language surnames
Portuguese-language surnames
Multiple Chinese surnames